John Spry may refer to:
 John Spry (priest), Archdeacon of Berkshire
 Sir John Farley Spry, Chief Justice of Gibraltar